Oleg Makarov may refer to:

Oleh Makarov, Soviet international footballer
Oleg Grigoryevich Makarov, Russian cosmonaut
Oleg Makarov, Soviet figure skater